There is relatively little history of active practice of Hinduism in Portugal. Presently there is a Hindu community of approximately 9,000 persons, which largely traces its origins to Indians who emigrated from the former Portuguese colonies of Lusophone Africa, particularly from Mozambique, and from the former colony of Diu, Daman and Goa and other possessions in Portuguese India.

From the mid 1990s on there was an influx of Hindus of Nepalese origin in Portugal as a result of labour migration originated from that South Asian country. Also since the 1990s it is possible to find in Lisbon a small Hare Krishna community, consisting mainly of Caucasians of Portuguese origin, but also Brazilian and devotes from other European countries.

Hindus in Portugal are, according to the Indian Embassy in Lisbon, mainly Gujaratis (Gujarati is taught at the Hindu Community Cultural Centre, in Lisbon), Punjabis and Goans. The majority of the Hindus live in the capital city, Lisbon, but it is also possible to find some Hindu-Gujarati families living in Oporto.

Hindu groups in Portugal

Gujaratis moved to Mozambique under colonial rule, and after the independence of that country in 1974, some of them moved to Portugal (particularly to Lisbon). Since the 1980s, Gujaratis have migrated to Portugal directly from their homeland in Gujarat and the island of Diu.

Goans first emigrated to Portugal in 1961, following the action of the Indian armed forces and subsequent liberation of Goa, Damão & Diu to India. They also built up a community in Mozambique before its independence, and then moved to Portugal. A liberal immigration policy and citizenship given to families of former Portuguese subjects in Goa has allowed their numbers to rise in Portugal.

Daman, Diu, Dadra and Nagar Haveli Hindus have been present in Portugal since slightly before the annexation of those territories in 1954 and 1961. Punjabis, who were subjects of British rather than Portuguese colonialism, have recently begun emigration to Portugal.

Nepalis (see Nepalis in Portugal)

Hare Krishna

Hindu organisation in Portugal

 The "Hindu Community of Portugal", a Hindu organisation, was founded in 1982 . There is also a Hindu temple, called Templo Hindu Radha Krishna, which belongs to Comunidade Hindu de Portugal, and is located at the Mahatma Gandhi alameda in Lisbon.

 Shiv Mandir Association. (Portuguese: Templo de Shiva - Associação de Solidariedade Social).

 BAPS Shri Swaminarayan Mandir, Lisbon (Portuguese: Missão Swaminarayan Hindu).

 ISKCON - Lisboa, Associação Internacional para a Consciência de Krishna.

References

Sources

 
 

 Pereira Bastos, Susana (2001) De Moçambique a Portugal. Reinterpretações identitárias do Hinduismo em viagem, Lisboa, Fundação Oriente, 373 pags.
 Trovão, Susana; Rosales, Marta (ed.) (2010) Das Índias. Gentes, movimentos e pertenças transnacionais, Lisboa, Edições Colibri, 207 pags.
 Lourenço, Inês (2009) Os Corpos da Devi. Religião e Género em Diáspora, Dissertação de doutoramento em Antropologia, ISCTE-IUL.
 Roxo, Pedro (2010) “Sonoridades Sul Asiáticas da Área de Lisboa: Nepaleses, Hindu-Gujarati e Sikhs [South Asian Sounds from the Lisbon Area: Nepalese, Hindu-Gujarati and Sikh]” in AAVV, Oriente/Ocidente. Miscigenações. Livro de Actas e Memória do Evento. Lisboa: Faculdade de Belas-Artes da Universidade de Lisboa.
 Roxo, Pedro (2010) “Hindu-Gujarati em Portugal, Música e Práticas Coreográficas entre os [Hindu-Gujarati in Portugal, Music and Choreographic Practices among the]” in Salwa Castelo-Branco (coord.) Enciclopédia da Música em Portugal no Século XX. Vol. 2, p. 612-617. Lisboa: Círculo de Leitores.
 Cachado, Rita Ávila (2014), "Localizando os hindus portugueses: a transnacionalidade nas cidades", Sociologia, Problemas e Práticas, CIES-IUL/Editora Mundos Sociais, nº76, pp. 109–124, [doi: 10.7458/SPP2014763330; ISSN 0873-6529; DisponíveL em: http://revistas.rcaap.pt/spp/article/view/3330]
 Cachado, Rita D'Ávila (2013), "O registo escondido num bairro em processo de realojamento: o caso dos hindus da Quinta da Vitória", Etnografica, vol. 17 (3), pp. 477–499; Disponível em: http://etnografica.revues.org/3201

External links
Hindu Community of Portugal - official site
Youth Network Hindu Community of Portugal - official site
http://www.shiva-pt.org/index.php
http://www.baps.org/Global-Network/UK-and-Europe/Lisbon.aspx
http://www.iskcon-lisboa.com/

Portugal
Portugal
Religion in Portugal